Lance Anderson (born February 5, 1971) is an American football coach and former player.

Playing career
Anderson played linebacker for Idaho State from 1993 through 1994. He walked on to the program after serving a church mission following high school.

Coaching career

Idaho State
Following his graduation in 1996, Anderson joined the coaching staff at his alma mater. In his first season, 1997, he coached the Idaho State running backs, before serving as the tight ends coach and assistant offensive line coach.

Mobile Admirals
In the summer of 1999, Anderson coached the running backs for the Mobile Admirals in the lone season of the Regional Football League. That season, the Admirals were 6-2 and won the league championship, the RFL Bowl I.

Bucknell
That fall, Anderson joined the Bucknell football staff as the tight ends and assistant offensive line coach. 
In 2001, Anderson moved to the defensive side of the ball, coaching the defensive line for two years. He also served as the programs recruiting coordinator during this time.

St. Mary’s (CA)
Anderson joined the St. Mary's (CA) coaching staff in 2003 as the co-defensive coordinator and defensive line coach. This was the final season the school had a football team.

Utah State
In 2004, Anderson reunited with former Bucknell defensive coordinator Dave Kotulski when he joined him at Utah State as the outside linebackers coach. Anderson's father wrestled and played football at Utah State.

San Diego
For the 2005 and 2006 seasons, Anderson was the defensive line coach and recruiting coordinator for Jim Harbaugh at San Diego.

Stanford
In 2007, Anderson followed Harbaugh to Stanford, where he coached the defensive tackles and served as the recruiting coordinator through 2009. From 2010 to 2013, he continued as the recruiting coordinators, but coached the outside linebackers. Prior to the 2014 season, Anderson was promoted to defensive coordinator after Derek Mason left to become the head coach at Vanderbilt. The official title for the position is the Willie Shaw Director of Defense. Anderson continued coaching the outside linebackers.
Prior to the 2018 season, Anderson was promoted to associate head coach.

Personal life

Lance and his wife, Sherri, reside in Menlo Park with their three children, Aubrey, Jaren and Braden. He was a three-sport athlete at Idaho's Minico High School, participating in football, baseball and track. He earned his degree from Idaho State University with a degree in biology.

References

1971 births
Living people
People from Rupert, Idaho
Players of American football from Idaho
American football linebackers
Idaho State Bengals football players
Coaches of American football from Idaho
Idaho State Bengals football coaches
Bucknell Bison football coaches
Saint Mary's Gaels football coaches
San Diego Toreros football coaches
Stanford Cardinal football coaches